Stromal membrane-associated protein 1 is a protein that in humans is encoded by the SMAP1 gene.

The protein encoded by this gene is similar to the mouse stromal membrane-associated protein-1. This similarity suggests that this human gene product is also a type II membrane glycoprotein involved in the erythropoietic stimulatory activity of stromal cells. Alternate splicing results in multiple transcript variants encoding different isoforms.

References

Further reading